Clement Mahachi (born 27 September 1979) is a Zimbabwean cricketer. He played nine first-class matches between 1999 and 2002.

References

External links
 

1979 births
Living people
Zimbabwean cricketers
CFX Academy cricketers
Matabeleland cricketers
Sportspeople from Bulawayo